Sparrmannia is an African genus of plants in the family Malvaceae.

Species
Plants of the World Online lists the following species as accepted:
 Sparrmannia africana L.f.
 Sparrmannia palmata Baker
 Sparrmannia ricinocarpa (Eckl. & Zeyh.) Kuntze

References

Malvaceae genera
Grewioideae